Phillipa Jean "Pip" Patterson (née Hale, born 8 December 1984) is a weightlifter from New Zealand. 

Patterson was a gymnast from the age of five to 14, before changing to crossfit and weightlifting. She competed in the 2014 Commonwealth Games, finishing fifth in the women's under 53 kg weight category. She also competed in the 2018 Commonwealth Games.

She won gold at the 2016 Oceania Weightlifting Championships, bronze in at the 2016 Commonwealth Championships and silver in the 2017 Oceania Weightlifting Championships. In 2017 she was named New Zealand's top female weightlifter.

References

External links

1984 births
Living people
Commonwealth Games competitors for New Zealand
Sportspeople from Auckland
Weightlifters at the 2018 Commonwealth Games
21st-century New Zealand women